The Benetton B192 is a Formula One racing car designed by Ross Brawn, Rory Byrne and Willem Toet and raced by the Benetton team in the 1992 Formula One season.

The car had a delayed start in 1992, being debuted at the Spanish Grand Prix while the team made do with an upgraded version of the B191 for the opening three rounds.

Competition history

The car was quite competitive with Michael Schumacher and Martin Brundle scoring several podiums with it. Schumacher, in his first full F1 season, came of age as a Grand Prix driver when he won the rain-affected Belgian Grand Prix after a clever pit strategy put him in the lead after dropping behind Brundle with a brief off and realizing upon seeing Brundle's tyres that the wets were blistering as the track dried. Brundle came close to a possible victory at the Canadian Grand Prix, chasing race leader Gerhard Berger until a transmission issue ended his bid at winning the race. Schumacher would finish the season third in the standings, Brundle sixth.

The car had a very well-designed, nimble chassis and it made the most of the disadvantages it inherited with the under-powered Ford V8. It did not have the sophisticated driver aids of its rivals, lacking active suspension, ABS, traction control, and a semi-automatic gearbox.

When Martin Brundle drove the B192 again in 2008 at Silverstone, he recalled that although it was slightly tail-happy, it was very comfortable to drive and said of it "...I can live with it, it's great!". It was a substantial improvement over the previous year's car which Brundle described as being "very heavy on the steering", "a real challenge to drive ... and sometimes it felt like a bathtub with a loose wheel".

Benetton finished third in the Constructors' Championship in 1992 after scoring points in every race of the season, with Schumacher finishing third in the Drivers' Championship with 53 points, ahead of reigning world champion Ayrton Senna, who won three races to Schumacher's one but who struggled with retirements.

Legacy

Although not held in awe like some of its more successful contemporaries, the B192 was recognised as a step forward for the Benetton team. Rory Byrne's philosophy of "evolution not revolution" meant that many of this car's features were integrated into the design of Schumacher's title-winning '94 and '95 Benettons.  Schumacher's win at Belgium would also prove to be the last win for a Formula One car using a conventional manual transmission.

Complete Formula One results
(key) (results in italics indicate fastest lap)

* 11 points scored using the Benetton B191B

References

External links

B192
1992 Formula One season cars